"Be Our Guest" is the twelfth and final episode of the fifth season of the anthology television series American Horror Story. It aired on January 13, 2016 on the cable network FX. This episode was written by John J. Gray and directed by Bradley Buecker.

Plot
One year after the incidents in "Battle Royale", Liz Taylor reflects on the renovated Hotel Cortez. Their first guests are a couple who like the rooms, however, Sally and Will Drake kill them. Liz and Iris urge the ghosts to stop the murders, but Sally and Will decline. James March intervenes and orders them to end it, or they will lose the hotel. Iris finds a miserable Sally and gifts her a phone with WiFi. Sally gets addicted to social media and becomes happier.

Liz asks Will to start designing again, while she will run Will's companies. Liz still cannot find happiness, so Iris invites Billie Dean Howard to communicate with Liz's dead lover, Tristan. Tristan does not respond, making Liz think that he still blames her for his death. Instead, Donovan communicates through Billie Dean and reaffirms his love for Iris and states that he is in a better place. Liz attends the birth of her granddaughter, but then learns that she has prostate cancer. Ramona offers to turn Liz, but Liz asks the ghosts to kill her. The Countess appears and slices Liz's throat while the other ghosts watch. Tristan then visits Liz's ghost, who had not seen Liz so that Liz would have continued living.

Iris and Ramona discuss Billie Dean's continuous expeditions into the Cortez with her film crew, and the shaky reputation it has given the hotel. John arrives, just before Devil's Night 2022, and agrees with them. Through flashbacks, John reveals that Alex and Holden had left to fend for themselves and they all ended up at the Cortez. Scarlett left to have a normal life while they continued staying until he was killed by police on the steps of the hotel, failing to reach the threshold before he died, therefore only appearing at the hotel on Devil's Night for March's serial killer party. Billie Dean is taken to the annual dinner party where the ghosts tell her to never mention the Cortez again, or she will be murdered. She refuses since the ghosts cannot leave the hotel, but Ramona makes it known that she can. John leaves the party to welcome Scarlett, who visits for a few hours every Devil's Night. Together they share family time in the hotel. The final scene is with The Countess who flirts and seduces a male guest at the hotel.

Reception
"Be Our Guest" was watched by 2.24 million people during its original broadcast, and gained a 1.1 ratings share among adults aged 18–49. It also ranked second in the Nielsen Social ratings, with 65,000 tweets seen by over 1.04 million people.

The episode received mixed to positive reviews, earning a 63% approval rating based on 16 reviews, with an average score of 6.4/10, on review aggregator Rotten Tomatoes. There is no critical consensus on the site as of May 2020. E.A. Hanks of The New York Times declared that the season "was populated with plots that went nowhere...as well as plots that were set up and resolved with minimal interest". However, the reporter contends that Denis O'Hare as Liz was the series' high note.

References

External links
 

2016 American television episodes
Fiction set in 2022
American Horror Story: Hotel episodes
Cultural depictions of John Wayne Gacy
Cultural depictions of Richard Ramirez